{{DISPLAYTITLE:C19H18O8}}
The molecular formula C19H18O8 (molar mass: 374.34 g/mol, exact mass: 374.1002 u) may refer to:

 Casticin
 Chrysosplenetin

Molecular formulas